Lesman Paredes Montaño (born 5 March 1996) is a Colombian born Bahraini weightlifter who won a Gold medal at the 2021 World Championships. He represents Bahrain since July 2022. He also won the gold medal in the men's 96kg event at the 2022 World Weightlifting Championships held in Bogotá, Colombia.

He set a new world record in the snatch of 187 kilograms (412.2 pounds) at the 2021 World Weightlifting Championships in 96 kg category. He is also a two-time gold medalist in the men's 102 kg event at the Pan American Weightlifting Championships.

He won the gold medal in his event at the 2022 Asian Weightlifting Championships held in Manama, Bahrain.

Paredes was born in Cali and raised in Buenaventura.

Major results

References

External links
 
 
 Lesman Paredes Montano at The-Sports.org
 

1996 births
Living people
Colombian male weightlifters
World Weightlifting Championships medalists
Pan American Weightlifting Championships medalists
Sportspeople from Cali
People from Buenaventura, Valle del Cauca
21st-century Colombian people